Arjun Tulshiram Pawar (also known as A. T. Pawar) was an Indian politician belonging to NCP. He was the minister of state for tribal welfare in the cabinet of Vilasrao Deshmukh in the Maharashtra state government. He was elected from the Kalvan constituency seven times and once from the Surgana constituency to the Maharashtra State Assembly.

He died in 2017 due to prolonged illness.

His daughter-in-law Bharati Pawar is current Minister of State, Ministry of Health and Family Welfare.

References

State cabinet ministers of Maharashtra
2017 deaths
Maharashtra MLAs 1972–1978
Maharashtra MLAs 1978–1980
Maharashtra MLAs 1980–1985
Maharashtra MLAs 1990–1995
Maharashtra MLAs 1995–1999
Maharashtra MLAs 1999–2004
Maharashtra MLAs 2004–2009
Maharashtra MLAs 2009–2014
Nationalist Congress Party politicians
Bharatiya Janata Party politicians from Maharashtra
Nationalist Congress Party politicians from Maharashtra